Graceton is a census-designated place located in Center Township, Indiana County in the state of Pennsylvania, United States.  The community is located between the borough of Homer City and the community of Black Lick on U.S. Route 119.  It is also located less than a mile from the other CDP of Coral.  As of the 2010 census, the population was 257 residents.

Demographics

References

External links

Census-designated places in Indiana County, Pennsylvania
Census-designated places in Pennsylvania